Jeznabad (also Romanized as Jeznābād and Jazanābād; also known as Gaiznābād) is a village in Baharestan Rural District, in the Central District of Nain County, Isfahan Province, Iran. At the 2006 census, its population was 86, in 35 families.

References 

Populated places in Nain County